Terebrantia is a suborder of thrips (order Thysanoptera). Order Thysanoptera includes 5,500 species classified into two suborders distinguished by the ovipositor. Terebrantia have a well-developed conical ovipositor, while the Tubulifera do not. It contains 13 families, five of which are only known from fossils. Members of Terebrantia mainly feed on plants. All have two larval instars followed by two pupal instars.

References 

 Mound, L.A., Nakahara, S. & Tsuda, D.M. 2016. Thysanoptera-Terebrantia of the Hawaiian Islands: an identification manual. ZooKeys 549, pages 71–126, 
 Peñalver, E.; Nel, P. 2010: Hispanothrips from Early Cretaceous Spanish amber, a new genus of the resurrected family Stenurothripidae (Insecta: Thysanoptera). Annales de la Société Entomologique de France (n.s.), 46, pages 138–147.

External links 

 
Insect suborders